8M  or 8-M may refer to:

8 m, or 8 metres
Maxair (aviation), IATA code
Myanmar Airways International, IATA code
Grigorovich M-8, a variation of the Grigorovich M-5
GCR Class 8M, a class of British 2-8-0 steam locomotive
8M, a model of Bensen B-8
Smena 8M, a model of  Smena (camera)
VO-8M, see VMA-231
 International Women's Day, shortening of

See also

8 Metre (keelboat)

M8 (disambiguation)
M (disambiguation)
8 (disambiguation)